Manu Lanvin (born 23 november 1973) is a French blues rock singer-songwriter, guitarist and producer. He's the son of French actor Gérard Lanvin.

Biography 
As an autodidact, Manu Lanvin starts drums and guitar and grows with some French artists as Téléphone, Paul Personne, Bernie Bonvoisin.

From 2000 to 2007, he edits three albums. In 2007, he meets the American bluesman Calvin Russell. They become friends and Manu coproduces Calvin Russell's last album studio Dawg Eat Dawg.

In 2012, Manu releases his fourth album Mauvais casting and a single Sur la route sixty one. The clip is filming in Mississippi with the  assistance of the Delta State University At Montreux Jazz Festival, he meets Quincy Jones who invites him to the Jazz Foundation of America in New York.

Manu writes the soundtrack for some films. He meets another American bluesman Neal Black and goes on tour with him in 2013 during their Paris-Texas Tour.

In 2014, he composes his fifth album Son(s) of the Blues and represents France at International Blues Challenge in Memphis.

Discography

Albums 
 2000: Venir au monde
 2004: Les temps mauvais
 2007: Faible humain
 2012: Mauvais casting
 2014: Son(s) of the Blues
 2016: Blues, Booze & Rock'n'Roll
 2019: Grand casino

Collaborations 
 2009: Dawg Eat Dawg by Calvin Russell
 2011: Contrabendo by Calvin Russell
 2011: The last call, in the heat of a night by Calvin Russell

Filmography

Musician 
 2006: On ne devrait pas exister by HPG
 2009: Lucky Luke by James Huth
 2010: Chicas by Yasmina Reza
 2012: Rock 'n' Bled by Touria Benzari, short

Actor 
 2011: A Gang Story by Olivier Marchal

References

External links 
 Official Site
 

Living people
1974 births
21st-century French singers
21st-century French male singers